Northwood Meadows State Park is a  state park in the town of Northwood, New Hampshire. Activities include nature walks, hiking, picnicking, fishing, non-motorized boating, biking, snowmobiling, and cross-country skiing. 

The wooded park has a vast wetlands area that includes a pond created by a dammed brook. A universally-accessible graveled trail leads to the pond, known as Burtt Wildlife Pond, after M. Edward Burtt, who built the park's boulder-fringed roads and dam. The state purchased the land in 1990, which abuts the Forest Peters Wildlife Management Area.

References

External links
Northwood Meadows State Park  New Hampshire Department of Natural and Cultural Resources

State parks of New Hampshire
Parks in Rockingham County, New Hampshire
Northwood, New Hampshire
Protected areas established in 1990
1990 establishments in New Hampshire